The Setai Hotel and Residences, also known as The Setai Miami Beach and The Setai South Beach, is a high rise luxury hotel and condominium located in South Beach in Miami Beach, Florida. The building has 38 floors and is 117.5 meters tall, making it one of the tallest buildings in Miami Beach. The hotel, designed by Jean-Michel Gathy, includes a recording studio and a  penthouse that includes a rooftop pool and jacuzzi.

Gallery

References

Residential skyscrapers in Miami Beach, Florida
Skyscraper hotels in Miami Beach, Florida
2004 establishments in Florida
Residential buildings completed in 2004
Hotels established in 2004